Michael Herck (born 4 August 1988 in Bucharest, Romania) is a Romanian-Belgian retired racing driver.

Career

Early life
Herck was adopted at the age of one and a half years by millionaire André Herck, a Belgian citizen born in Bucharest. Herck grew up in Monaco, and began his racing career in karting in France.

Formula Renault
After karting, Herck moved to the Formula Renault Monza Winter Series in 2003 and competed in the full series the next year. He won the 2004 championship with five wins and 375 points. He also competed in the Belgian and Spanish 1.6-litre series in 2004, winning the latter championship.

In 2007 he drove in the Formula Renault 3.5 Series for the Comtec Racing team, but failed to score any points.

Formula Three

Herck moved to Formula Three for 2005, winning the Austrian championship. He also made selected appearances in that year's British and German championships. In 2006 he competed in the Formula 3 Euro Series with backing from compatriot Bas Leinders, scoring twelve points to finish fifteenth in the championship.

GP2 Series
Herck competed in the first eight races of the inaugural GP2 Asia Series in 2008 for the FMS International team before breaking his wrist in an accident, missing the last round of the season.

He was scheduled to drive in the main GP2 Series for 2008 as well, but was initially replaced by Giacomo Ricci in the David Price Racing team until his wrist healed. After two rounds of the championship, Ricci was dropped in favour of Andy Soucek as Herck continued to recover. He finally made his GP2 début at Magny-Cours. He continued with DPR for the 2008–09 GP2 Asia Series season, and also the 2009 GP2 Series season. At the Autódromo Internacional do Algarve, Herck finished sixth on the road during the feature race. However, his first GP2 points were stripped from him due to irregularities with his DPR machine. His first points eventually came during the 2009–10 GP2 Asia Series, finishing seventh in the feature race of the second Abu Dhabi round. After overtaking Max Chilton at the start of the sprint race, Herck was heading to his first podium and victory in the series, but Davide Valsecchi passed him just before the race's conclusion. Herck ultimately finished thirteenth in the championship standings.

Herck continued his improved form in the 2010 main series, finishing in the points on a number of occasions. He also qualified on pole position for his "home" race in Belgium, but lost it due to an infringement. He finished sixteenth in the drivers' championship.

Following the withdrawal of DPR from GP2, Herck switched to the Coloni team for 2011. In the Asia series, he was partnered variously by James Jakes and Luca Filippi, and finished eighth in the championship after scoring points in three of the four races. In the main series, he scored only a single point and finished 21st in the standings.

Retirement
Following a disappointing 2011 season in the main GP2 Series, Herck decided not to compete in the 2011 GP2 Final non-championship race in Abu Dhabi, and retired from professional motor racing in order to focus on his studies, as later confirmed by adoptive parent André Herck.

Racing record

Career summary

Complete Formula Renault 3.5 Series results
(key) (Races in bold indicate pole position) (Races in italics indicate fastest lap)

Complete GP2 Series results

Complete GP2 Asia Series results
(key) (Races in bold indicate pole position) (Races in italics indicate fastest lap)

References

External links
Official website
Career statistics from driverdb.com.

Living people
1988 births
Sportspeople from Bucharest
Belgian racing drivers
Romanian racing drivers
Belgian Formula Renault 1.6 drivers
Italian Formula Renault 1.6 drivers
Italian Formula Renault 2.0 drivers
GP2 Series drivers
Formula 3 Euro Series drivers
British Formula Three Championship drivers
German Formula Three Championship drivers
GP2 Asia Series drivers
Austrian Formula Three Championship drivers
Belgian people of Romanian descent
World Series Formula V8 3.5 drivers
David Price Racing drivers
Scuderia Coloni drivers
Comtec Racing drivers
Pons Racing drivers
Team Lazarus drivers